Tommaso Imperato (1596 – 7 October 1656) was a Roman Catholic prelate who served as Bishop of Vico Equense (1647–1656).

Biography
Tommaso Imperato was born in Naples, Italy in 1596. On 27 May 1647, he was appointed during the papacy of Pope Innocent X as Bishop of Vico Equense. On 2 June 1647, he was consecrated bishop by Pier Luigi Carafa, Cardinal-Priest of Santi Silvestro e Martino ai Monti, with Ranuccio Scotti Douglas, Bishop of Borgo San Donnino, and Alessandro Vittrici, Bishop of Alatri, serving as co-consecrators.  He served as Bishop of Vico Equense until his death on 7 October 1656.

See also 
Catholic Church in Italy

References

External links and additional sources
 (for Chronology of Bishops) 
 (for Chronology of Bishops)  

17th-century Italian Roman Catholic bishops
Bishops appointed by Pope Innocent X
1596 births
1656 deaths
16th-century Neapolitan people
17th-century Neapolitan people